William Rushworth (born 1807) was an English organ builder and the founder of the musical instrument firm Rushworth and Dreaper. The firm was noted for the manufacture of organs at The Queen's College, Oxford, The Royal Military Academy, Sandhurst, Goldsmiths' College, Guilford Cathedral and Liverpool Philharmonic Hall.

Biography 
Rushworth was born in 1807 in Honley, West Yorkshire, and baptized on the 23rd of October. He had three children: Edwin, Alfred and Walter. His wife, Sarah, died in 1844.

References 

1807 births
Year of death unknown
Organ builders of the United Kingdom